This is a list of the 6 members of the European Parliament for Cyprus in the 2004 to 2009 session.

List

Party representation

2004
List
Cyprus